Events from the year 1999 in North Korea.

Incumbents
Premier: Hong Song-nam
Supreme Leader: Kim Jong-il

Events	
	 
7 March :1999 North Korean local elections

9–15 June:First Battle of Yeonpyeong

See also
Years in Japan
Years in South Korea

References

 
North Korea
1990s in North Korea
Years of the 20th century in North Korea
North Korea